Daniel Logan (born 6 June 1987) is a New Zealand-born American actor. Logan is best known for his portrayal of Boba Fett from the 2002 film Star Wars: Episode II – Attack of the Clones, for which he was nominated for a Young Artist Award for Best Performance in a Feature Film (Supporting Actor) at the age of 15. Logan also voiced Fett in the animated series Star Wars: The Clone Wars.

Early life and career
Logan was born in Auckland on 6 June 1987. He broke into acting when his amateur rugby union team was scouted for a TV commercial, where he was chosen to play the role of a small child who gets knocked into the mud by Auckland rugby star Michael Jones. Picked up by a casting agent, he began to do more commercials and TV appearances, including a recurring role in episodes of the New Zealand-based medical series Shortland Street and a guest appearance in the international series Hercules: The Legendary Journeys.

Logan is best known for his role as the young Boba Fett in Star Wars: Episode II – Attack of the Clones when he was 15. He reprised his role in Star Wars: The Clone Wars and appeared through archive footage in The Book of Boba Fett.

Logan is of Māori descent. In 2017, Logan was granted American citizenship. He now lives in Tustin, California.

Filmography

References

External links

Boba Fett Fan Club Official website
 
 Daniel Logan at BFI
 Daniel Logan at AllMovie

1987 births
20th-century American male actors
21st-century American male actors
20th-century New Zealand male actors
21st-century New Zealand male actors
American people of Māori descent
New Zealand male child actors
New Zealand male film actors
New Zealand male Māori actors
New Zealand male voice actors
New Zealand emigrants to the United States
Living people
People educated at Massey High School
People from Tustin, California
People with acquired American citizenship
People from Auckland